The following highways are numbered 514:

Canada
Alberta Highway 514
Newfoundland and Labrador Route 514
 Ontario Highway 514 (former)

United States
  Florida State Road 514
  Maryland Route 514
  County Route 514
  Ohio State Route 514
  Pennsylvania Route 514
  Puerto Rico Highway 514
  Washington State Route 514 (former)